The 2009 Asian Archery Championships was the 16th edition of the event. It was held in Denpasar, Bali, Indonesia from 15 to 21 December 2009 and was organized by Asian Archery Federation.

Medal summary

Recurve

Compound

Medal table

References

Asian Championship
A
Asian Archery Championships
Asian Archery Championships